The Shin Brook Formation is a geologic formation in Maine. It preserves fossils dating back to the Ordovician period.

See also

 List of fossiliferous stratigraphic units in Maine
 Paleontology in Maine

References
 

Ordovician Maine
Ordovician southern paleotemperate deposits